Cascine di Buti is a village in Tuscany, central Italy,  administratively a frazione of the comune of Buti, province of Pisa. At the time of the 2001 census its population was 2,999.

Cascine di Buti is about 25 km from Pisa and 3 km from Buti.

References 

Frazioni of the Province of Pisa